Clodovis Boff (born in 1944, Concórdia, Santa Catarina, Brazil) is a Roman Catholic theologian, philosopher, writer and professor.

Biography

Clodovis Boff is grandson of Italian immigrants who arrived from Veneto region to Rio Grande do Sul in the late nineteenth century. He did his primary and secondary studies in Concordia, Rio Negro and Agudos. Boff studied philosophy in Mogi das Cruzes and obtained a doctorate in theology at the Catholic University of Leuven, Belgium. As early as 1986 Clodovis Boff declared that the acquisition of Marxist categories have performed in the early stages of liberation theology an attitude of carelessness and exaggeration. Currently, Clodovis Boff and his brother Leonardo Boff are confronted ideologically due to his brother's position in relation to ecclesiastical institutions. Leonardo still considering that option for the poor is "a truly evangelical option to have a life bathed to submerge in the faith of Christ, both in its origin, it comes from the encounter with the Son of God, who was rich became poor, but also in his exercise, as vibrates to the sentiments of the Good Shepherd's heart". He is a Catholic theologian of the Order of the Servite Order, initially an adherent of Liberation Theology, and now in full agreement with the Latin American bishops who gathered in Aparecida in 2007. Boff lives in Curitiba and is a professor at the Pontifical Catholic University of Paraná. Unlike his brother Leonardo Boff, he was not processed by the Congregation for the Doctrine of the Faith, although in the 1980s he lost his chair at the Pontifical Catholic University of Rio de Janeiro, in addition to being restricted from the theological faculty of his Order in Rome.

Works

 Theology and practice - The epistemological foundations of liberation theology. Kaiser Verlag, Munich 1983, .
 The liberation of the poor: reflections on the basic concern of Latin American liberation theology, Ed. Exodus, 1986, .
 Leonardo Boff: How to drives theology of liberation? Patmos Verlag, Düsseldorf, 1986, .
 Rottländer Peter (ed.): Liberation theology and Marxism, Liberation Edition, 1986, .
 Norbert Greinacher (ed.): Reversal and a new beginning: the North-South conflict as a challenge to theology and the church in Europe, Ed. Exodus, 1986, .
 Jorge Pixley: The Bible, the Church, and the Poor (The Option for the Poor); Maryknoll, N.Y.: Orbis Books, 1989, .
 Feet-on-the-Ground Theology - A Brazilian Journey. WIPF and STOCK Publishers, 2008, .

References

External links
 http://chiesa.espresso.repubblica.it/articolo/205773?sp=y
 http://www.itpol.de/?p=257

21st-century Brazilian Roman Catholic priests
Brazilian Roman Catholic theologians
1944 births
Living people
People from Concórdia, Santa Catarina
20th-century Brazilian Roman Catholic priests